Choi Myeong-suk (최명숙, born 19 February 1934) is a South Korean athlete. She competed in the women's shot put at the 1952 Summer Olympics.

References

1934 births
Living people
Athletes (track and field) at the 1952 Summer Olympics
South Korean female shot putters
Olympic athletes of South Korea
Place of birth missing (living people)